The 2018 Constellation Cup was the 9th Constellation Cup series played between Australia and New Zealand. The series featured four netball test matches, played in October 2018. 
The Australia team was coached by Lisa Alexander and captained by Caitlin Bassett. New Zealand were coached by Noeline Taurua and captained by Laura Langman. Australia won the series 3–1.

Squads

Australia

New Zealand

 
Debuts
 Erikana Pedersen made her senior debut for New Zealand in the third test on 14 October 2018.

Matches

First test

Second test

Third test

Fourth test

References

2018
2018 in New Zealand netball
2018 in Australian netball
October 2018 sports events in New Zealand
October 2018 sports events in Australia